The Men of Kent Cemetery is a historic cemetery on Meetinghouse Lane in Scituate, Massachusetts.  The cemetery dates from the earliest days of Scituate's settlement, estimated to have been established in 1628.  It is the town's oldest cemetery, containing the graves of some of its original settlers.  The  cemetery is also the site where the town's first meeting house was built in 1636.  The cemetery is so named because Scituate was founded by colonists from the English county of Kent.

The cemetery was listed on the National Register of Historic Places in 2013.

See also
 National Register of Historic Places listings in Plymouth County, Massachusetts

References

External links
 
 

Cemeteries on the National Register of Historic Places in Massachusetts
Cemeteries in Plymouth County, Massachusetts
National Register of Historic Places in Plymouth County, Massachusetts
Scituate, Massachusetts
Cemeteries established in the 17th century
1628 establishments in Massachusetts